The 1990 All-Ireland Senior Football Championship was the 104th staging of the All-Ireland Senior Football Championship, the Gaelic Athletic Association's premier inter-county Gaelic football tournament. The championship began on 6 May 1990 and ended on 16 September 1990.

Was the final year of common Cork vs Kerry Munster finals stretch back to 1947 expect 4.

Cork entered the championship as the defending champions.

On 16 September 1990, Cork won the championship following an 0-11 to 0-9 defeat of Meath in the All-Ireland final. This was their sixth All-Ireland title and their second in succession.

Meath's Brian Stafford was the championship's top scorer with 1-24. Cork's Shea Fahy was the choice for Texaco Footballer of the Year.

Championship draw

As a result of the Republic of Ireland football team qualifying for the 1990 FIFA World Cup, the Munster Council took precautions in avoiding a fixtures clash and a potential loss of revenue by changing the dates and times of their games.

The championship

Format

Connacht Championship

Quarter-finals: 
(2 matches) These are two lone matches between the first four teams drawn from the province of Connacht.  Two teams are eliminated at this stage, while the two winning teams advance to the semi-finals.

Semi-finals: (2 matches) The two winners of the two quarter-finals join the two remaining Connacht teams to make up the semi-final pairings.  Two teams are eliminated at this stage, while the two winning two teams advance to the final.

Final: (1 match) The two winners of the two semi-finals contest this game.  One team is eliminated at this stage, while the winners advance to the All-Ireland semi-final.

Leinster Championship

First round: (3 matches) These are three lone matches between the first six teams drawn from the province of Leinster.  Three teams are eliminated at this stage, while the three winning teams advance to the quarter-finals

Quarter-finals: (4 matches) The three winners of the three first-round games join the five remaining Leinster teams to make up the semi-final pairings.  Four teams are eliminated at this stage, while the four winning two teams advance to the semifinal.

Semi-finals: (2 matches) The four winners of the four quarter-finals contest this game.  Two teams are eliminated at this stage, while the two winners advance to the final.

Final: (1 match) The two winners of the two semi-finals contest this game.  One team is eliminated at this stage, while the winners advance to the All-Ireland semi-final.

Munster Championship

Quarter-finals: (2 matches) These are two lone matches between the first four teams drawn from the province of Munster.  Two teams are eliminated at this stage, while the two winning teams advance to the semi-finals.

Semi-finals: (2 matches) The winners of the two quarter-finals join the two remaining Munster teams to make up the semi-final pairings.  Two teams are eliminated at this stage, while the two winning two teams advance to the final.

Final: (1 match) The winners of the two semi-finals contest this game.  One team is eliminated at this stage, while the winners advance to the All-Ireland semi-final.

Ulster Championship

First round: (1 match) This is a lone match between the first two teams drawn from the province of Ulster.  One team is eliminated at this stage, while the winning team advances to the quarter-finals.

Quarter-finals: (4 matches) The winner of the lone first-round game join the seven remaining Ulster teams to make up the quarter-final pairings.  Four teams are eliminated at this stage, while the four winning two teams advance to the semi-finals.

Semi-finals: (2 matches) The four winners of the four quarter-finals contest this game.  Two teams are eliminated at this stage, while the two winners advance to the final.

Final: (1 match) The two winners of the two semi-finals contest this game.  One team is eliminated at this stage, while the winners advance to the All-Ireland semi-final.

All-Ireland Championship

Semi-finals: (2 matches) The Munster champions play the Connacht champions in the first semi-final while the Leinster champions play the Ulster champions in the second semi-final.  Two teams are eliminated at this stage, while the two winners advance to the All-Ireland final.

Final: (1 match) The winners of the two semi-finals contest the All-Ireland final.

Fixtures

Connacht Senior Football Championship

Quarter-finals

Semi-finals

Final

Leinster Senior Football Championship

First round

Quarter-finals

Semi-finals

Final

Munster Senior Football Championship

Quarter-finals

Semi-finals

Final

Ulster Senior Football Championship

First round

Quarter-finals

Semi-finals

Final

All-Ireland series

Semi-finals

Final

Championship Statistics

Miscellaneous

 Laois beat Offaly for the first time since 1968.
 Roscommon play Leitrim in the Connacht championship for the first time since 1975.
 The Munster final was between Cork vs Kerry for the 25th year in a row and for the 40th time since 1947 in total.
 There were a number of first-time championship meetings. Both All Ireland semi-finals were the first Championship meetings of Cork vs Roscommon & Meath vs Donegal.
Cork became the first Munster team not Kerry to retain the All Ireland title and won their 4th Munster title in a row and were the first county since Tipperary in 1900 to be both All Ireland Champions in football and hurling 100 years after their first one also Tipperary in 1895, 1900, Cork in 1890 and 1990 were All Ireland football and hurling champions in the same season.

Top scorers

Overall

Single game

References